John Christopher Hawken is an English keyboard player, best known as a member of The Nashville Teens, Renaissance, and the Strawbs. He also played in Spooky Tooth, Third World War, Vinegar Joe, Illusion, as well as being a session musician.

Background
Hawken was born 9 May 1940 in Bournemouth, England. He trained in classical piano from the ages of 5 until 18, prompted by his mother Dorothy Constance Hawken, who was formally trained as both a pianist and painter from an early age. He took an interest in Rock and roll and, in 1960, joined his first rock band – the Cruisers Rock Combo. The band included future Renaissance guitarist Michael Dunford.

Nashville Teens
In 1962, The Cruisers Rock Combo were joined by singers Ray Phillips and Arthur Sharp to form The Nashville Teens. John Allen soon joined on lead guitar after Dunford's departure, and Terry Crowe joined as a third singer. This line-up turned professional in 1963 and went to Germany to play in the clubs (including Hamburg's Star-Club).

In 1964 (now minus Terry Crowe and with Barry Jenkins on drums) The Nashville Teens signed a management contract and recorded "Tobacco Road," at the same time touring with Chuck Berry and Carl Perkins on their first tour of England. "I was delighted to be playing piano for both of them, in addition to playing the Nashville Teens set", said Hawken. The band went to the US in late 1964 to play the "Murray the K" Christmas show at the Fox Theater in Brooklyn and subsequently toured extensively in England and Europe.

Peter Harris left the group in 1966 and was replaced on bass by Neil Korner, formerly of The New Vaudeville Band. Neil and John Hawken also worked together from time to time in a popular London pick-up band, Frankie Reid & The Powerhouse, which also featured Dana Gillespie on vocals and occasionally, the saxophone section from Cliff Bennett's Rebel Rousers, plus John Knightsbridge on guitar (later of Illusion).

Although subsequent records failed to equal the success of "Tobacco Road," the band worked steadily until Hawken moved on late in 1968.

Renaissance
In late 1968 former Yardbird Chris Dreja, John Hawken and steel player Brian (B.J.) Cole were going to form a country-rock band, to be managed by Peter Grant and produced by Mickey Most, but they never got beyond the rehearsal stage. Dreja, aware that his former Yardbirds colleagues Jim McCarty and Keith Relf were putting together a new band, suggested Hawken as a possible member. In early 1969 Hawken got a telephone call from McCarty asking if he was interested in the new project. Hawken turned up at McCartys' house in Thames Ditton, along with bass player Louis Cennamo, Dreja and Cole. Cole and Dreja subsequently dropped out of the project.

A short time later Jane Relf joined on vocals and Renaissance was born, with a line-up of Keith and Jane Relf, McCarty, Hawken and Cennamo. The band's self-titled debut album was released in October 1969, followed by an American tour in early 1970. During the recording of the band's second album, Keith Relf, McCarty, and Cennamo departed. Hawken formed a new lineup of the band with former Nashville Teens members Terry Crowe, Michael Dunford, and Neil Korner, as well as session drummer Terry Slade. After a European tour, Jane Relf left to be replaced by American singer Binky Cullom.

Hawken was contacted by Spooky Tooth (an English rock band) in October 1970 with an offer to join the band. Hawken accepted, helping his successor, John Tout, to integrate with the band before leaving.

After Renaissance
Hawken joined Spooky Tooth for a three-month European tour in support of their album The Last Puff. After the tour was complete, Spooky Tooth disbanded.

In 1971, Hawken joined Third World War. Hawken recorded one album (the band's second release). The group also included John Knightsbridge on lead guitar, who would later join Hawken in Illusion.

Hawken also worked as a session musician, playing on Spooky Tooth bandmate Luther Grosvenor's solo album, as well as projects by Claire Hamill and The Sutherland Brothers.

Strawbs
After a brief spell with Vinegar Joe, whom he left in September 1972, Hawken joined the Strawbs in 1973. At his audition, Dave Cousins introduced Hawken to the mellotron. During Hawken's tenure with the band they released two albums, Hero and Heroine and Ghosts. Tours included the US, Japan and Europe. In late 1975, Hawken left the band after disagreements over the more commercial direction that the other members wanted to go in.

Illusion
In 1976, Hawken and the other original Renaissance members began to work on a reunion. After Keith Relf's death, the band was re-shuffled, bringing in John Knightsbridge on lead guitar and Eddie McNeill on drums, with McCarty sharing vocals with Jane Relf and also playing rhythm guitar. Unable, for legal reasons, to use the name Renaissance, they chose "Illusion" – which had been the title of their second album as Renaissance. The group recorded two albums, Out of the Mist  and Illusion, before disbanding in 1979. In 1990, a further album of unreleased material was released under the name Enchanted Caress.

United States
On 29 October 1979, John, his wife Alexandra and sons Barnaby & Jody moved to the United States from the UK, and Hawken went into a temporary retirement from music.

In 2001, the surviving members of the original Renaissance – Jim McCarty, Jane Relf, Louis Cennamo and John Hawken – recorded and released the album Through the Fire under the band name 'Renaissance Illusion'.

In 2004 the Hero and Heroine Strawbs line-up reunited, and undertook a number of tours both in the US and Europe, recording two new albums: Deja Fou and The Broken Hearted Bride. 
On 26 June 2008, Hawken announced his retirement from touring.

In October 2011 Hawken came out of retirement to perform with Jim McCarty and Jann Klose at Hugh's Room and This Ain't Hollywood, Ontario for two Chamber Pop Summits. In 2019, he joined the Strawbs for their 50th anniversary show.

Screen appearances
Hawken appeared briefly in the David Essex film, That'll Be the Day (1973) as the keyboard player in the band led by Stormy Tempest (Billy Fury), which also featured Keith Moon on drums.

Discography

The Nashville Teens 
 1964: Tobacco Road

Renaissance 
 1969: Renaissance
 1971: Illusion

Third World War 
 1972: Third World War II

Strawbs 
 1974 : Hero and Heroine
 1975 : Ghosts
 1995 : Strawbs in Concert
 2004 : Déjà Fou
 2005 : Live at Nearfest
 2008 : Lay Down with the Strawbs
 2008 : The Broken Hearted Bride
 2020 : Live In Concert

Illusion 
 1977: Out of the mist
 1978: Illusion
 1990: Enchanted Caress (Recorded in 1979, released in 1990)
 2001: Through the fire (Under the name "Renaissance Illusion")

Collaborations 
 1971: Luther Grosvenor - Under Open Skies 
 1971: Claire Hamill - One House Left Standing 
 1972: The Sutherland Brothers - Lifeboat
 2007: The Smithereens - Meet The Smithereens! 
 2018: Jim McCarty - Walking In The Wild Land

References

External links
Official website (archived)
Strawbs website
Northern Lights Renaissance website

Discogs.com entry

1940 births
English keyboardists
Living people
Musicians from Bournemouth
English expatriates in the United States
Strawbs members
Renaissance (band) members